{{Infobox building
|name               = The Shang Grand Tower
|image              = 
|image_size         = 
|caption            = 
|location           = Perea Street corner Dela Rosa Street, Legaspi Village, Makati, Philippines
|coordinates        = 
|building_type      = Residential
|status             = Complete
|architectural_style= Post Modernist-Art-Deco architecture
|start_date         = 2003
|completion_date    = November 2005
|opening            = March 8, 2006
|antenna_spire      = 
|roof               =  
|top_floor          = 
|floor_count        = 46 aboveground, 4 belowground
|elevator_count     = 7
|cost               = Php 2,000,000,000 
|floor_area         =  
|architect          = Palmer & Turner (P & T) Architects and Engineers Ltd.; Recio + Casas Architects  
|structural_engineer= Ove Arup Philippines
|main_contractor    = D.M. Consunji, Inc.
|developer          = EDSA Property Holdings, Inc.
|owner              = The Shang Grand Tower Condominium Corporation
|management         = The Shang Grand Tower Condominium Corporation
|references         = <ref name=SGTfaq>The Shang Grand Tower website [http://www.theshanggrandtower.com/interface_fr.htm The Shang Grand Tower official website]</ref>D.M. Consunji, Inc. Shang Grand Tower
}}

The Shang Grand Tower, also known as simply the Shang Tower, is a high-end residential condominium  skyscraper located in Makati, Philippines. It was developed by Shang Properties, Inc. The 46-storey building was opened in 2006 and rises to 180 metres (630 feet) from the ground to its architectural top. It is currently the 10th-tallest complete'' building in Makati, and is the 19th-tallest building in the country and Metro Manila as well. The 250-unit condominium was the first self-funded residential condominium of Shangri-La Hotels and Resorts’ Kuok Group in the country, and all units were sold-out as of 2006.

Construction and design
The Shang Grand Tower was designed by international architectural firm Palmer & Turner (P & T) Architects and Engineers Ltd., in cooperation with local architectural firm Recio + Casas Architects; while the structural design was provided by engineering company Ove Arup Philippines, the local branch of international engineering firm Arup. Project and construction management works were provided by Jose Aliling & Associates, and the general contractor was D.M. Consunji, Inc.

International landscape consultants Belt Collins were responsible for its outdoor panoramic designs, while “designers to the hotel and resort industry,” Hospitality and Leisure Asia set the tone for its general interiors.

The Shang Grand Tower construction began in September 2003, a period in which the Philippines was recovering from the effects of the 1997 Asian Financial Crisis. Structural work was done at a rate of 1 floor per week, and was topped-off in March 2005. The building was formally completed in November 2005, and was formally opened to the public on March 8, 2006

Design

The building stands on a nearly 2,900 sq.m. of land, and roughly 71,000 sq.m. of floor space takes the shape of the letter “Z” with a straight line in the middle. This enables unit owners at the extreme ends of “Z” to have three views of the outside.

The exterior has a post-modern with traditional art deco design with verdant tinted glass.  The entrance lobbies have marble and granite finishes, and are divided into low zone (from 6th to 26th floor) and high zone (from 27th floor up to the penthouse). Each zone consists of three passenger lifts and one common service lift.

Residential units have floors in “engineered wood” Pergo flooring; tiles from Hong Kong; imported granite kitchen countertop; main doors in solid wood and veneered on the surface; picture windows in blue-green tempered glass in powder-coated aluminum frames; underground and overhead water tanks, a standby generator to supply 75 percent of the building's power needst. Main doors have one side that have a narrow extra door which opens to allow entry or exit of big items for the homes.

The building is purely residential in nature, with no commercial or office space, no bridgeways or walkways to connect it to any commercial and office establishment.

See also
 List of tallest buildings in Metro Manila

References

External links
The Shang Grand Tower official website
The Shang Grand Tower at Emporis
The Shang Grand Tower at Skyscraperpage

Skyscrapers in Makati
Residential skyscrapers in Metro Manila
Residential buildings completed in 2005